The 2000 Seattle Seahawks season was the franchise's 25th season in the National Football League (NFL), the first of two seasons the Seahawks played at Husky Stadium while Qwest Field was being built and the second under head coach Mike Holmgren. The 2000 Seahawks' pass defense surrendered 7.63 yards-per-attempt (including quarterback sacks), one of the ten-worst totals in the history of the NFL. They failed to improve on their 9–7 record or defend their AFC West title from 1999.

The last remaining active member of the 2000 Seattle Seahawks was kicker Rian Lindell, who retired after the 2013 season.

Offseason

NFL draft

Personnel

Staff

Final roster

     Starters in bold.

Schedule

Preseason
Divisional matchups have the AFC West playing the NFC West.

Source: Seahawks Media Guides

Regular season
Divisional matchups have the AFC West playing the NFC West.

Bold indicates division opponents.
Source: 2000 NFL season results

Standings

Game Summaries

Preseason

Week P1: vs. Indianapolis Colts

Week P2: at Arizona Cardinals

Week P3: vs. San Francisco 49ers

Week P4: at Oakland Raiders

Regular season

Week 1: at Miami Dolphins

Week 2: vs. St. Louis Rams

Week 3: vs. New Orleans Saints

Week 4: at San Diego Chargers

Week 5: at Kansas City Chiefs

Week 6: at Carolina Panthers

Week 7: vs. Indianapolis Colts

Week 8: at Oakland Raiders

Week 9: vs. Kansas City Chiefs

Week 10: vs. San Diego Chargers

Week 11: at Jacksonville Jaguars

Week 13: vs. Denver Broncos

Week 14: at Atlanta Falcons

Week 15 at Denver Broncos

Week 16: vs. Oakland Raiders

Week 17: vs. Buffalo Bills

Notes

Sources

References

External links
 Seahawks draft history at NFL.com
 2000 NFL season results at NFL.com

Seattle
Seattle Seahawks seasons
Seattle Seahawks